Narthecium ossifragum, commonly known as bog asphodel, Lancashire asphodel or bastard asphodel, is a species of  flowering plant in the family Nartheciaceae. It produces spikes of bright yellow flowers in summer. The bright orange fruits have been used as a colourant to replace saffron by Shetland Islanders. Despite the plant's English name "bog asphodel", it is not particularly closely related to the true asphodels. In addition to other forms of pollination, this plant is adapted to rain-pollination. The Latin specific name ossifragum means "bone-breaker", and refers to a traditional belief that eating the plant caused sheep to develop brittle bones. The probable origin of this story is that sheep eating a calcium-poor diet are likely to develop bone weakness, and N. ossifragum favours acidic low-calcium soils.

Description
Bog asphodel is a tufted, hairless herbaceous perennial with a creeping rhizome. The fruits are deep orange.

Biology
The plant can cause photosensitisation, a serious skin condition of sheep called alveld, "elf fire", in Norway. It can be relieved by moving stock into the shade. Not all stands of the plant are toxic, and the toxicity may be the side effect of the plant's response to a fungal infection.

Distribution and habitat
The Bog asphodel has a temperate oceanic distribution in northern and western Europe. In the British Isles it occurs in Scotland, Northwest England, Wales, Southwest England and most of Ireland. It grows in wet soils and peats, in bogs, wet heaths and flushes. It can be found in purple moor grass and rush pastures.

Gallery

References

Nartheciaceae
Flora of Europe
Plants described in 1753
Taxa named by Carl Linnaeus